B101 may refer to:

Radio stations branded "B101" 
 CIQB-FM, 101.1 MHz in Barrie, Ontario
 WBQB, 101.5 MHz in Fredericksburg, Virginia
 WWBB, 101.5 MHz in Providence, Rhode Island
 WBEB, 101.1 MHz in Philadelphia, Pennsylvania

Other 
 B101 road (Great Britain)
 Blackburn B-101 Beverley (1950), a transport airplane